The Shere Hills are a range of undulating hills and rock formations on the Jos Plateau, situated about 10 km east of the Jos metropolis, the capital of Plateau State in the Middle Belt region of Nigeria.

Peaks 

See also 
Shere, Plateau State

References

Links 
 Hiking on the Plateau

Mountains of Nigeria
Plateau State